Venison Creek is part of the Chequamegon-Nicolet National Forest.

References

Rivers of Wisconsin